I Don't Want to Lose You may refer to: 

 "Don't Wanna Lose You", a song by Gloria Estefan
 "I Don't Wanna Lose You", a song by Tina Turner
 "I Don't Want to Lose You", a song by The Spinners from Pick of the Litter (The Spinners album)
 "I Don't Want to Lose You", a song by REO Speedwagon from their 1988 album The Hits
 I Don't Want to Lose You Baby, an album by Chad and Jeremy